Binaca is an American brand of breath spray distributed by Ranir, LLC, a subsidiary of Perrigo. The sprays contain denatured alcohol and isobutane, the latter used as a propellant.

History

In 1974, Binaca was estimated to be worth . That year, Air Wick was acquired by Ciba-Geigy, and Binaca was moved into Air Wick's consumer products unit.

Safety

Alcohol misuse
In October 1993, articles in The Boston Globe and The Tribune reported that children and teenagers were supposedly inhaling Binaca in order to induce intoxication. The administration of Los Osos Middle School in Los Osos, California, prohibited students from possessing Binaca, citing safety concerns. Then-principal Greg Pruitt stated, "The kids were misusing it, spraying other kids and just horsing around. [...] Some years it's frogs and butterflies. One year it was Silly String. This year it was Binaca." Some stores and pharmacies in the Los Osos and Boston areas began storing Binaca products behind the counter and refusing to sell them to minors.

References

Dentifrices
Oral hygiene